Neo Chwee Kok, John Paul (31 May 1931 – 23 January 1987) was a Singaporean swimmer who competed in the 1952 Summer Olympics. He was ranked third in a list of Singapore's 50 Greatest Athletes of the Century by The Straits Times in 1999.

Neo was born the fifth child in a family of eight in Singapore but grew up on Pulau Sambu, Riau, Indonesia.

On 23 January 1987, Neo died of cancer at the age of 55.

References

External links
 
 
 
 
 
 

1931 births
1987 deaths
Singaporean male freestyle swimmers
Olympic swimmers of Singapore
Swimmers at the 1952 Summer Olympics
Asian Games gold medalists for Singapore
Asian Games silver medalists for Singapore
Asian Games bronze medalists for Singapore
Asian Games medalists in swimming
Swimmers at the 1951 Asian Games
Swimmers at the 1954 Asian Games
Medalists at the 1951 Asian Games
Medalists at the 1954 Asian Games
People from the Riau Islands
20th-century Singaporean people